Artie Green is a former basketball player in the United States. Artie Green is from the Soundview area of Bronx, NY. He played at Taft High School (Bronx), and had the nickname "Jumping" Artie Green.  He was also known as high jumping Artie Green. His last nickname was Artie Grasshopper Green. He was well known for his dunking ability.  Artie also was famous for playing at the Rucker Park. https://wiki.muscoop.com/doku.php/men_s_basketball/artie_green

Basketball career

In the NBA draft, Green was picked in the 10th round with the 	221 overall pick. Artie was selected by the Milwaukee Bucks. Artie was a 6'1 point guard.  In college, he played at Marquette University.  He played in the year 1980 for them.

References

Living people
African-American basketball players
American men's basketball players
Marquette Golden Eagles men's basketball players
Milwaukee Bucks draft picks
Point guards
Shooting guards
Street basketball players
Year of birth missing (living people)
21st-century African-American people